Brockman's gerbil (Gerbillus brockmani) is distributed mainly in Somaliland and is only known from the type locality, Burao in central Somaliland.

References

  Database entry includes a brief justification of why this species is listed as data deficient

Endemic fauna of Somalia
Gerbillus
Rodents of Africa
Mammals described in 1910
Taxa named by Oldfield Thomas